Malapert is a lunar impact crater that lies near the southern limb of the Moon. From the Earth this formation is viewed from the side, limiting the amount of detail that can be seen. The crater is also illuminated at very low angles, so that parts of the interior remain in almost constant darkness. The nearest craters of note are Cabeus to the west, and Shoemaker to the south-southeast and nearer to the south pole of the Moon.

The rim of Malapert forms an irregular ring of peaks around the interior floor. The western side of the rim is overlain by what appear to be impact craters. There are also small craters overlying the southeastern rim. Much of the interior and details of the rim remain hidden by shadows.

The southwestern part of the rim forms part of a 5-km-high rise in the surface that has been unofficially designated Malapert Mountain. This ridge appears wider along a line running roughly east–west, although details of the back side are hidden by shadows. The peak of this ridge lies almost exactly along 0° longitude, and it has the unusual attribute of lying within sight of both the Earth and the crater Shackleton at the south pole.

Mission concepts and plans

Due to the location of Malapert Mountain, it has been proposed as the site of a transmitter for an expedition to the south lunar pole. The back side of this ridge also lies within the radio shadow for transmissions from the Earth, and it has been suggested as a site for a radio telescope because the radio noise from our planet would be blocked.

In July 2013, private company Moon Express released details of a mission they are planning for no earlier than 2018.  The mission will land two telescopes on the Moon, with the preferred location of Malapert crater, to take advantage of the benefits previously identified by David. The equipment would include both a  radio telescope as well as an optical telescope. 
This is the specific mission design of the mission first announced publicly the previous year, in collaboration with the International Lunar Observatory Association (ILOA).

Satellite craters 

By convention these features are identified on lunar maps by placing the letter on the side of the crater midpoint that is closest to Malapert.

Images 

At a Space Resources Roundtable co-sponsored by the Lunar and Planetary Institute a presentation by B. L. Cooper underscored the difficulty of imaging terrain illuminated by high-incidence-angle light. Nonetheless the images in her presentation show the Malapert Mountain area well.

In popular culture 

In the 1970s British science fiction series Space: 1999, the location of Moonbase Alpha is Malapert Crater.

The International Lunar Observatory (ILO-1) is a lunar-based optical telescope that will be launched after 2022, and will land on the Malapert Mountain ridge.

See also 

 Peak of Eternal Light

References 

 

 
 
 
 
 
 
 
 
 
 
 
 

Impact craters on the Moon